This is a list of female mystics.

Bahá'í faith 
 Táhirih
 Bahíyyih Khánum
 Ásíyih Khánum

Buddhism 
 Alexandra David-Néel author of books on Tibetan Mysticism
 Yeshe Tsogyal 8th century CE Tibetan mystic, consort of Padmasambhava
 Khema
 Yaśodharā
 Patacara
 Uppalavanna

Christianity 
 Beatrice of Nazareth Flemish nun
 Joan of Arc French saint
 Teresa of Avila Spanish saint
 Maria Bolognesi Italian (blessed)
 Bridget of Sweden Swedish Saint
 Heilwige Bloemardinne
 Marguerite Bays Swiss (blessed)
 Maria Domenica Lazzeri
 Hildegard of Bingen German saint
 Edith Stein German Saint
 Catherine of Siena Italian saint
 Itala Mela Italian Venerable
 Consolata Betrone Italian nun
 Hadewijch Dutch nun
 Jeanne Guyon
 Anne Catherine Emmerich (blessed)
 Margery Kempe
 Anna Kingsford
 Christina of Markyate
 Flower A. Newhouse
 Julian of Norwich
 Marguerite Porete
 Mechthild of Magdeburg
 Mother Shipton
 Catherine of Siena
 Lilian Staveley
 Simone Weil
 Maria Maddalena de' Pazzi
 Gertrude the Great - Saint
 Gemma Galgani

Hinduism

Vedic and classical
 Ghosha
 Gargi Vachaknavi
 Maitreyi
 Lopamudra

Medieval
Akka Mahadevi
Sant Andal (Nachiar or Goda-devi)
Sant Avvaiyar
 Isaignaniyar
Sant Bahinabai
Sant Janabai
Sant Kanhopatra
Lalleshvari
Sant Mirabai
Gangasati
Sant Molla
Sant Muktabai
Sant Nirmala
Sant Rupa Bhawani, saint-poet
Sant Sahajo Bai, 1725-1805
Sant Sakhubai

Modern
Amma Sri Karunamayi
Anandamayi Ma
Mata Amritanandamayi
 Ma Devi Jnanabhanishta
The Mother
Mother Meera
Sarada Devi
Gurumayi Chidvilasananda
Daya Mata
Sister Nivedita

Islam 
Rabi'a al-Adawiyya
Hazrat Babajan

Judaism 
Hannah Rachel Verbermacher

Jainism 
Sister Champa

Sikhism
Bebe Nanaki

Taoism
Sun Bu'er

Western mysticism and syncretism 
Helena Blavatsky
Annie Besant
Alice Bailey
Mabel Collins
Helena Roerich
Florence Scovel Shinn

Further reading
 Kishwar, Madhu. Women Bhakta Poets : Manushi (Manushi Publications, 1989).

 
Mystics
Mystics